is a railway station on the Minobu Line of Central Japan Railway Company (JR Central) located in the town of Minobu, Minamikoma District, Yamanashi Prefecture, Japan.

Lines
Hadakajima Station is served by the Minobu Line and is located 50.2 kilometers from the southern terminus of the line at Fuji Station.

Layout
Hadakajima Station has a single island platform serving 2 tracks connected to the station building by a level crossing. The station is unattended.

Platform

Adjacent stations

History
It was renamed  in 1930 and renamed again to its present name on October 1, 1938. The line came under control of the Japanese Government Railways on May 1, 1941. The JGR became the JNR (Japan National Railway) after World War II. Along with the division and privatization of JNR on April 1, 1987, the station came under the control and operation of the Central Japan Railway Company.

Surrounding area
 Tokiwa River

See also
 List of railway stations in Japan

External links

 Minobu Line station information  

Railway stations in Japan opened in 1927
Railway stations in Yamanashi Prefecture
Minobu Line
Minobu, Yamanashi